Black Ice is a 2007 Finnish drama film written and directed by Petri Kotwica. Produced as a Finnish-German joint production, it stars actors Outi Mäenpää, Martti Suosalo and Ria Kataja in a twisted love triangle.

The film was first screened at the Helsinki International Film Festival on 26 September 2007 before being released to the Finnish movie theaters on 19 October 2007.

Black Ice was nominated for nine Jussi Awards, eventually winning five, including Best Lead Actress (Outi Mäenpää) and Best Film. Petri Kotwica was also nominated for Best Director at the Berlin International Film Festival as was Ria Kataja for her role as Tuuli at the Festroia International Film Festival.

Plot
Musta jää is a psychological Ménage à trois, where two women compete for the same man. Saara is a doctor who finds out her husband, an architecture teacher, is having an affair with a young student called Tuuli. Saara develops a new identity so she can befriend her husband's mistress. The movie takes place in Helsinki. The Canadian film If I Were You (2012), starring Marcia Gay Harden, Leonor Watling and Aidan Quinn reworks a similar storyline.

Cast
 Outi Mäenpää as Saara, the wife. After finding out that her husband is cheating on her, Saara decides to create a new identity as Crista and befriends her husband's mistress in order to find out what he sees in her.
 Martti Suosalo as Leo, the husband. An architecture teacher who seems to enjoy the attention he receives from his students. It is revealed by Tuuli that she is not the first affair he's had.
 Ria Kataja as Tuuli, as the mistress. A student under Leo's tutelage, she eventually comes to perceive Saara's alter ego as a friend only to realize that something is not right.
 Ville Virtanen as Ilkka, Leo's business partner and Lea's husband.
 Sara Paavolainen as Lea, Leo's sister. She works at the hospital with Saara.

Other cast members include: Netta Heikkilä as Krista; Väinö Heiskanen as Joonas; Philipp Danne as Uwe; Matti Laine as Komu; Emilia Sinisalo as Receptionist; and Anne von Keller as Nurse.

Soundtrack
The soundtrack for Black Ice was written by Eicca Toppinen of the band Apocalyptica. The song "Black Ice" was released by Hanna Pakarinen as a promotional single for the film. A music video, depicting scenes from the film was also released. Lyrics for the theme song were written by Johnny Andrews.
"Interlude" - 3:29
"Deception" - 3:26
"Alone in the Dark" - 4:02
"New Start" - 1:37
"Caesarean" - 2:59
"Cooma II" - 6:39
"Terror" - 4:01
"Dream" - 3:58
"Fragility" - 2:57
"Exposure" - 2:41
"Love Song" - 3:43
"Iced Plan" - 1:39
"Evil Ground" - 3:34
"Transformation" - 2:35
"Atonement" - 2:09
"Black Ice" (ft. Hanna Pakarinen) - 4:05

Remake
Korean film Love, In Between is based on this film.

References

External links

2007 films
2007 drama films
2000s Finnish-language films
Finnish drama films